"Why Don't You Love Me" is a song by American singer and guitarist Hank Williams. The song reached number one on the U.S. Country & Western chart. It was released as a single in 1950 with the B-side, "A House Without Love".

Background 
Like his previous hits "You're Gonna Change (Or I'm Gonna Leave)" and "I Just Don't Like This Kind of Living", "Why Don't You Love Me" was likely inspired by Hank's turbulent relationship with his wife Audrey Williams.  However, the song is more lighthearted in nature, with the narrator admonishing himself ("I'm the same old trouble you've always been through") and became Williams' third No. 1 country hit.  The tune was recorded in Nashville at Castle Studio with Fred Rose producing on January 9, 1950, and featured Jerry Rivers (fiddle), Don Helms (steel guitar), Bob McNett (lead guitar), Jack Shook (rhythm guitar), and Ernie Newton (bass).  It is set in common time composed in a moderate tempo, with a main key of F major with a basic sequence of F–C7–B♭ as its chord progression.

"Why Don't You Love Me" was featured over the closing credits of the film The Last Picture Show.

Charts

Cover versions 
George Jones recorded it for his 1960 album George Jones Salutes Hank Williams.
Hank Williams Jr. recorded the song as a duet with Lois Johnson.
The song was covered by Jerry Lee Lewis in 1969.
Little Richard covered the song in 1972.
It was covered by American country artist Connie Smith in 1975 and was released as a single, peaking at No. 15 on the Billboard Country chart.
It was covered in 1977 by Moe Bandy on his album Cowboys Ain't Supposed To Cry.
Elvis Costello and the Attractions cover the song on their 1981 country covers album Almost Blue, recorded in Nashville.
The Red Hot Chili Peppers covered the song on their self-titled debut album.
It was recorded by My Morning Jacket on Early Recordings, Chapter 2: Learning.
Van Morrison and Linda Gail Lewis covered the song on their 2000 album You Win Again.
The Secret Sisters recorded the song for their début album.
Tom Jones released a version on his 2015 album Long Lost Suitcase

References

Sources
 

1950 singles
Hank Williams songs
Connie Smith songs
Van Morrison songs
Songs written by Hank Williams
1950 songs
Song recordings produced by Fred Rose (songwriter)